Saint Maharsapor (or Sapor; died 421) was an early Persian Christian martyr who is considered a saint. Different sources give his feast day as 10 October, 2 November or 27 November.

Life

Maharsapor was a Persian of noble family who was brought up as a Christian.
After the destruction of a Zoroastrian temple, King Yazdegerd I (r. 399–420) launched a persecution of the Christians.
Maharsapor, Narses (or Parses) and Sabutaka were arrested and tortured.
Narses and Sabutaka were executed, but Maharsapor was held in prison for three years, and was periodically tortured and offered his freedom if he would abandon his faith.
Eventually, in the reign of Bahram V (r. 420–438), he was thrown in a pit and starved to death.

Monks of Ramsgate account

The Monks of Ramsgate wrote in their Book of saints : a dictionary of servants of God canonized by the Catholic Church (1921),

Butler's account

The hagiographer Alban Butler wrote in his Lives of the Primitive Fathers, Martyrs, and Other Principal Saints (1799),

Notes

Sources

Persian saints
421 deaths